Miguel Ângelo Almeida Vieira Tavares (born 29 August 1998) is a Portuguese professional footballer who plays for Belenenses as a winger.

Football career
On 18 February 2019, Tavares made his professional debut with Aves in a 2018–19 Primeira Liga match against Benfica.

Personal life
Born in Portugal, Tavares is of Cape Verdean descent. His brothers Cláudio and Jair Tavares, and his cousin Renato Sanches are also professional footballers.

References

External links

1998 births
Living people
Footballers from Lisbon
Portuguese footballers
Portuguese people of Cape Verdean descent
Association football wingers
SC Mirandela players
C.D. Aves players
F.C. Penafiel players
Casa Pia A.C. players
Primeira Liga players
Liga Portugal 2 players
Campeonato de Portugal (league) players
C.F. Os Belenenses players